Muang Xay, also referred to as Oudomxai or Oudomxay, is the capital city of Oudomxai Province, Laos.

Naming
Legend has it that in the year 1323, the inhabitants of the village Ban Luang Cheng in "Takka Sila" town were in the forest to cut bamboo. While they were making some bamboo fishing utensils, they saw a monk coming from the forest walking towards them. He had gone to the forest long before to meditate. The monk asked the villagers what they were doing and they replied that they were making a fishing basket. They offered him food. Because of that experience, the villagers changed the town's name from "Takka Sila" to "Muang Xay", as the monk's name was "Paxay".

History
In 1987, Muang Xay became the capital of Oudomxay Province instead of Ban Nahin.

Infrastructure
Oudomxay is connected to Luang Prabang by National Route 1.

The town is served by Oudomsay Airport, about a 10 minute walk from town center.

It has a station on the Boten–Vientiane railway.

Demography

The residents of the town are mainly Lao Loum, but the presence of the ethnic group Khmu, 60% of the province's population, has an important impact on the town.

In the past, many ethnic Khmu moved from Khmu villages to Muang Xay and now live and work there, as in the town they see better opportunities to earn money.

Hmong, 15% of the provincial population, have an influence on the town. Typical Hmong products like colorful textiles are sold inside the market building.

Many women from the surrounding villages of different ethnic groups come to Muang Xay to sell their products at the town markets, often spending hours walk, as they can get better prices there.

Some families living in surrounding villages send their children to school in Muang Xay. The way, which is often many kilometers, is covered either by bicycle or by foot by the children. Some sons and daughters also go to the so-called "ethnic school", a boarding school in Muang Xay for children from more remote villages.

In Muang Xay there are many Chinese immigrants, which influence the town scape through restaurants and a Chinese market.

Geography and climate
Muang Xay is in a mountain basin between green hills. Two opposed hills soar above the town. On one is the "Oudomxay Museum", on the other one is a Buddhist temple with a stupa.

Oudomxay Province has a moderate monsoon climate. Due to its relatively high elevation, there are more variations in temperature during the year and a colder dry season in northern Laos than in the rest of the country.

Yearly precipitation is about 1,900–2,600 mm. Temperatures in February and March average between 18 and 19 °C, from April to May temperatures climb over 31 °C.

Especially in the colder months (October to January) there are high variations in temperature from day to night. Due to Oudomxay's location between hills and mountains, fog covers the town from evening to morning. In the course of the day, the fog starts to dissolve, so that in the cool season, mornings are brisk.

The Nam Kor River flows through Muang Xay.

Tourism

For some years, efforts have been made to encourage tourism in Muang Xay in order to ameliorate the region's poverty. Since 1997 there has been a tourism office in Muang Xay, supported by the German Development Service (DED) since 2005. The support of DED aims to raise the incomes of the rural population and small-scale enterprises via tourism and thereby protect natural resources. .  In August 2007 the tourism office was upgraded to a Provincial Tourism Department.

Development
Due to Oudomxay's location as the most important traffic junction in northern Laos (the only road from Luang Prabang to the north passes through Oudomxay), in the past few years the province was mainly visited by foreigners passing through.

The average length of stay was short. Oudomxay had the image of being undeveloped and uninteresting to tourists, which was reflected in articles about the town in tourist guidebooks.

This is changing. Oudomxay is nowadays seen as a province in which discovering "authentic" Laos is possible, especially in terms of ecotourism. The tourism office offers guided trekking tours, a Lao cookery course, and a workshop on traditional paper making. In Oudomxay there are now two travel agencies, one of them offering guided bicycle tours through Laos.

According to the Statistical Report on Tourism in Laos 2008 by the Lao National Tourism Administration, the number of tourists has increased from approximately 18,600 to 102,000 between 2001 and 2008. According to the statistics, approximately 17% of all 1.7 million tourists visiting Laos in 2008 came to Oudomxay. Oudomxay has eight hotels and approximately 52 guesthouses, most of them in the provincial capital of Muang Xay and the riverine traffic junction Pakbeng.

Potential
Overall, about 1,286 beds were available in Oudomxay in 2006. In 2008, their occupancy rate was approximately 60% compared to 73% in Luang Prabang.

Poor infrastructure impedes the development of tourism in Oudomxay Province. This is clear in the example of the recently new discovered Chom Ong Cave, about 45 km from Oudomxay, the largest known cave in northern Laos. It has a length of more than 16 km, ceiling heights up to 50 m, a stream course flowing in the cave and is rated "exceptional" and "the most significant find and the biggest highlight"  in northern Laos by several speleological magazines.

The cave complex is accessible after an hour's walk from the village of Ban Chom Ong Thai, but access to that village is by dirt roads which become difficult in the rainy season. The cave's potential as a tourist destination is thus hampered because of the lack of infrastructure.

References

External links

Populated places in Oudomxay Province